Callum Roddie Elder (born 27 January 1995) is an Australian professional soccer player who plays as a left back for Hull City and the Australia national team.

Early and personal life
Elder was born to an Irish mother and Scottish father. His maternal grandfather is former Ireland international footballer Paddy Turner.

Club career

Leicester City
A left back, Elder was born in Sydney, Australia and began his youth career with Manly United, before moving to England at the age of 16 to begin a scholarship in the academy at Leicester City. After completing his scholarship at the end of the 2012–13 season, he was awarded his first professional contract. Graduating to the Foxes' U21 team, he progressed to sign a new two-year deal at the end of the 2014–15 season and a further extension a year later, which kept him at the King Power Stadium until June 2019.

Mansfield Town (loan)
On 8 January 2015, Elder was loaned out to League Two club Mansfield Town for one month. He made his professional debut two days later, starting in a 2–1 away loss against Burton Albion. He became a regular starter, which saw his loan extended to the end of the 2014–15 season. Elder made 21 appearances for the Stags and returned to Leicester at the end of the season.

Peterborough United (loan)
On 29 August 2015, Elder joined League One side Peterborough United on a one-month loan, which was later extended until January 2016. He made 21 appearances and scored the first senior goal of his career, which came in a 4–0 thrashing of Doncaster Rovers on 24 October 2015. A foot injury suffered in a match versus Blackpool on 19 December led to the early termination of Elder's loan.

Brentford (loan)
On 30 July 2016, Elder joined Championship side Brentford on loan for the duration of the 2016–17 season. He was an ever-present in league matches during the opening month of the season, before suffering a knee injury during a 2–0 win over Brighton & Hove Albion on 10 September 2016. Elder's recovery was delayed by a thigh injury and he returned to the King Power Stadium for treatment in mid-December 2016. He returned to training with Brentford on 16 January 2017, but failed to make an appearance before being recalled by Leicester City two weeks later.

Barnsley (loan)
On 31 January 2017, Elder joined Championship club Barnsley on loan until the end of the 2016–17 season.

Wigan Athletic (loan)
On 31 July 2017, Elder joined Wigan Athletic on a season long loan. He made his debut on 5 August at Milton Keynes Dons but was sent off in the 44th minute. Wigan won the match 1–0. He scored his first goal for Wigan on 17 January 2018 as they defeated Premier League side Bournemouth in the FA Cup.

Ipswich Town (loan)
On 2 January 2019, Elder joined Ipswich Town on loan for the remainder of the 2018–19 Championship season.

Hull City
On 8 August 2019, Elder joined Championship side Hull City for an undisclosed fee, signing a three-year contract. The move reunited him with Grant McCann, his manager at Peterborough United. Elder made his debut on 14 September 2019, in a 2–2 draw at home to Wigan Athletic. He scored his first goal for Hull on 5 April 2021 in a 3–0 win against Northampton Town.
On 18 May 2022, Hull City exercised an option for an additional year on his contract.

International career
Elder was eligible to play for Australia, Scotland, Ireland and England at international level. In October 2013, Elder was called up by Australia U20 for the 2014 AFC U19 Championship qualifying matches and made a single appearance in a 3–0 win over Chinese Taipei on 5 October. He was not named in the squad for the tournament finals.

In August 2021, Elder was called up to the Australia squad for 2022 FIFA World Cup qualification matches against China and Vietnam. He made his debut on 2 September 2021 in a game against China, a 3–0 home victory. He substituted Aziz Behich in the 79th minute.

Style of play
Elder describes himself as "an athletic full back. I like getting up and down the left-hand-side of the pitch".

Career statistics

Honours
Wigan Athletic
League One: 2017–18

Hull City
League One: 2020–21
Individual
PFA Team of the Year: 2020–21 League One
 EFL League One Team of the Year: 2020–21

References

External links

1995 births
Living people
Soccer players from Sydney
Australian soccer players
Australia international soccer players
Australia youth international soccer players
Australia under-20 international soccer players
Australian people of Irish descent
Australian people of Scottish descent
Association football defenders
Leicester City F.C. players
Mansfield Town F.C. players
Peterborough United F.C. players
Brentford F.C. players
Barnsley F.C. players
Wigan Athletic F.C. players
Ipswich Town F.C. players
Hull City A.F.C. players
English Football League players
Australian expatriate soccer players
Australian expatriate sportspeople in England
Expatriate footballers in England